Hedi El Kholti (born February 24, 1967, in Rabat, Morocco) is a writer and editor based in Los Angeles. He is co-editor of Semiotext(e) alongside Chris Kraus and Sylvère Lotringer. He was partner at the now defunct Dilettante Press and currently edits Semiotext(e)’s ‘occasional intellectual journal’ Animal Shelter. He is a graduate of the Art Center College of Design.

Bibliography
Animal Shelter 1 (Semiotext(e), 2008)
Animal Shelter 2 (Semiotext(e), 2012)
Animal Shelter 3 (Semiotext(e), 2013)

References

External links
Semiotext(e) Homepage
Hedi El Kholti on WorldCat

People from Casablanca
Living people
1967 births
Moroccan writers
Art Center College of Design alumni
Writers from Los Angeles
American people of Moroccan descent